Cornelia Lister and Renata Voráčová were the defending champions, but they chose not to participate.

Jaqueline Cristian and Elena-Gabriela Ruse won the title, defeating Ekaterine Gorgodze and Raluca Șerban in the final, 7–6(8–6), 6–7(4–7), [10–8].

Seeds

Draw

Draw

References
Main Draw

Engie Open Andrézieux-Bouthéon 42 - Doubles